That Dog (styled as that dog.) is a Los Angeles-based rock band that formed in 1992 and dissolved in 1997, reuniting in 2011. The band originally consisted of Anna Waronker on lead vocals and guitar, Rachel Haden on bass guitar and vocals, her sister Petra Haden on violin and vocals, and Tony Maxwell on drums.

The band's original work drew critical comparisons with the output of Redd Kross, Wednesday Week, Dolly Mixture and Buzzcocks.

Biography
Lead vocalist Anna Waronker is the daughter of record industry mogul Lenny Waronker and singer Donna Loren, and the sister of drummer Joey Waronker of Beck, R.E.M. and Atoms for Peace. She is married to Steve McDonald of Redd Kross. Petra and Rachel Haden are daughters of jazz bassist Charlie Haden.

The group began when Anna and a friend, Jenni Konner, began writing short punk songs in her bedroom about boys. Waronker had known Petra and Rachel Haden since high school, so they fluidly found their way in to playing her songs with her. Mutual friend Tony Maxwell picked up the drum duties.

Their self-titled first album was originally released on a limited run as a double 7" on the independent label Magnatone Records in 1992. It was soon after re-released on cassette and compact disc by Geffen. During this time, the band was good friends with, often played on records by, and toured with label mates Beck and Weezer. Members contributed to the Beck songs "Girl of My Dreams", "Totally Confused" and the single "Steve Threw Up", as well as Weezer's "I Just Threw Out the Love of My Dreams", all released as B-sides by the aforementioned artists.

1995 saw the release of Totally Crushed Out! to little fanfare, and the massive yet futile tour that supported the record left Waronker feeling burned out and dejected about the music business in general.  The band's members also contributed to several tracks on Mike Watt's Ball-Hog or Tugboat? record.

On April 8, 1997, That Dog released their third album, Retreat from the Sun, and added Kenny Woods (Steven McDonald Group, Beck, Anders & Woods) on guitar. It has been confirmed that Anna Waronker originally intended to release the album as a solo record.  She has claimed in interviews that her A&R pressured her in to letting That Dog record the album. Retreat from the Sun spawned the group's only charting radio hit, "Never Say Never", which reached No. 27 on the U.S. Billboard Modern Rock charts in 1997.

That year the band toured the US with various acts including, Blur, The Wallflowers, and Counting Crows. On July 2, 1997, Counting Crows kicked off a co-headlining tour with The Wallflowers that continued through September.  This tour included opening acts by Bettie Serveert, Engine 88, Gigolo Aunts, and That Dog, with each opening band touring for a three-week stretch. While touring with Counting Crows, The Wallflowers were also playing their own headlining dates when Counting Crows tour was on break (Counting Crows frontman Adam Duritz experienced swollen vocal cords and had to back out of several shows in July).

The group issued a formal statement announcing their disbandment in September 1997. Since that time, all the members of the band have kept active in the music business. Anna Waronker has contributed music to soundtracks and released her solo debut album, Anna, in 2002 on her own Five Foot Two Records label; she released her second solo album, California Fade, in 2011. Petra Haden has released two solo albums: 1999's Imaginaryland and 2005's Petra Haden Sings The Who Sell Out in which she reinvents The Who's classic 1967 album as an a cappella tour de force. In 2005, she joined The Decemberists as a full-time member, but no longer plays with the band. Petra Haden has also contributed vocals and violin to recordings by many artists including Green Day, Bill Frisell, Miss Murgatroid, and The Rentals. Rachel Haden has contributed vocals to albums by Jimmy Eat World, Say Anything, Ozma and Nada Surf, and was also a member of the reformed version of The Rentals (featuring ex-Weezer bassist Matt Sharp) for a brief period. Tony Maxwell has worked as a composer, most notably on the films Chuck & Buck and The Good Girl (both written by Mike White).

Anna Waronker and her band frequently play clubs in the Los Angeles area. Petra and Rachel have sporadically gigged with third sister Tanya (the three are triplets) as the Haden Triplets.

Reunion
On June 21, 2011, after a few months of the band having an official presence on Facebook, the band used their page to announce a reunion show on August 26 at the Troubadour in Los Angeles.  A second show was added for the 28th due to demand; both shows sold out.  Openers for the shows included Tenacious D and a Prince cover band led by Maya Rudolph, who like Petra and Rachel Haden was a member of The Rentals. The band announced additional reunion shows for 2012: Two shows at Largo at the Coronet in Los Angeles on April 13 (the second show was added after the first sold out), and performances in Brooklyn, New York, on May 24–25, 2012, at the Music Hall of Williamsburg. The announcement for the Los Angeles shows stated that the band would be performing with an expanded string section, and would feature some songs never performed before.

On May 25, 2012, The Village Voice published an interview with Anna Waronker where she hinted that there may be new music from the band in the future. In 2017, Waronker, Rachel Haden and Maxwell indicated that they were in the process of recording a fourth album. Petra Haden declined to participate in the recording process, opting not to continue with the band.

On August 21, 2019, the band announced that their fourth studio album, Old LP will be released on October 4, 2019. A music video for "Just the Way" was released on October 2, 2019.

Band members
Anna Waronker – lead vocals, guitar
Rachel Haden – bass guitar, vocals
Tony Maxwell – drums

Former members
Petra Haden – violin, vocals

Discography

Studio albums

Extended plays and singles
That Dog double 7" (1993) Magnatone
Buy Me Flowers 7" (1993) Guernica
"Old Timer" (1994) DGC
Waldo the Dog Faced Boy/That Dog split 10" (1994) WIN Records
Grunge Couple 7" (1994) self-released
"He's Kissing Christian" (1995) DGC
"Never Say Never" (1997) DGC
"If You Just Didn't Do It" (2019) UMe

Compilation appearances
DGC Rarities: Volume 1 (1994) DGC – "Grunge Couple"
Volume Nine (1994) Volume Magazine – "One Summer Night" (alternate version)
Jabberjaw: Good to the Last Drop (1994) Mammoth Records – "Explain"
The Poop Alley Tapes (1995) WIN Records – "Ridiculous"
Spirit of '73: Rock for Choice (1995) Epic/550 Music – "Midnight at the Oasis" (Maria Muldaur)
A Small Circle of Friends: A Germs Tribute (1996) Grass Records – "We Must Bleed" (Germs)
Hear You Me! A Tribute to Mykel and Carli (1998) Vast Records – "Silently" (acoustic version)

Music videos
"Old Timer" (1994, directed by Spike Jonze)
"He's Kissing Christian" (1995, directed by Frank Sacramento)
"Never Say Never" (1997, directed by Mark Kohr)
"Just the Way" (2019, directed by Casey Storm)

References

External links

[ AllMusic profile]
Rolling Stone: That Dog page

Alternative rock groups from California
Indie rock musical groups from California
Musical groups from Los Angeles
4AD artists
Musical groups established in 1992
Musical groups disestablished in 1997
Musical groups reestablished in 2011
1992 establishments in California